CBS 9 may refer to one of the following television stations in the United States:

Current
KXLH-LD in Helena, Montana
Re-broadcast of KRTV in Great Falls, Montana
KWTV in Oklahoma City, Oklahoma
WUSA in Washington, District of Columbia
WAFB in Baton Rouge, Louisiana
WWTV in Cadillac / Traverse City, Michigan
WNCT-TV in Greenville / New Bern / Washington, North Carolina
ZBM-TV in Hamilton, Bermuda (branding channel; broadcasts on channel 20.9)

Former
KBTV (now KUSA-TV) in Denver, Colorado (1952 to 1953)
KECY-TV in El Centro, California / Yuma, Arizona (1970 to 1982 and 1985 to 1994)
KGMB in Honolulu, Hawaii (1952 to 2009)
KVTV (now KCAU-TV) in Sioux City, Iowa (1953 to 1967)
WSTV/WTOV-TV in Steubenville, Ohio / Wheeling, West Virginia (1953 to 1980)
WGN-TV in Chicago, Illinois (affiliated with CBS from 1948 to 1949, then secondary until 1953; now an independent station)
KMBC-TV in Kansas City, Missouri (1953 to 1955)